Siderophile means "iron-loving". This can refer to:
 Siderophilic bacteria, bacteria that require or are facilitated by free iron
 Siderophile elements, chemical elements such as iridium or gold that tend to bond with metallic iron, as described by the Goldschmidt classification
 Siderophilia, another name for haemochromatosis, a disease in which the body accumulates too much iron